Dunsinane is a 2010 play by David Greig.  It premiered in a Royal Shakespeare Company production at the Hampstead Theatre from 10 February to 6 March 2010, directed by RSC Associate Director Roxana Silbert and with leads including Siobhan Redmond and Jonny Phillips.

Plot
The narrative is formed by the events following the defeat of Macbeth by Malcolm and an English army in the Battle of Dunsinane at the end of William Shakespeare’s play Macbeth. In Greig’s version, Lady Macbeth is known as Gruach. Having outlived her second husband Macbeth, after she had Macbeth kill her first husband, Gruach continued to enforce the Moray claim to the throne via herself and her son by her first marriage. The playwright parallels the attempted nation-building by the English leader Siward and the continued bloodshed against the English occupying forces with contemporary events in Afghanistan and Iraq. He also includes the Shakespearean characters MacDuff and Malcolm, as well as introducing new characters such as Siward’s English subordinate Lord Egham and a chorus of English soldiers.

Adaptation
A radio adaptation premiered on BBC Radio 3 directed by Roxana Silbert and with original songs and music composed by Nick Powell on 30 January 2011. The cast included:

Tour
The National Theatre of Scotland has toured the Royal Shakespeare Company production since 2011 to theatres in Scotland, England, China, Hong Kong, Taiwan, Russia and the United States.

Notes and references

References

Sources

2010 plays
Plays and musicals based on Macbeth
British plays
Plays set in Scotland
Plays based on real people